Gruppo Bertone, commonly known as Bertone, was an Italian industrial design company which specialized in car styling, coachbuilding and manufacturing. It formerly was also a car manufacturing company. Bertone styling was distinctive, with most cars having a strong "family resemblance" even if they were badged by different manufacturers. Bertone had styled cars for Abarth, Alfa Romeo, Aston Martin, BMW, Citroën, Ferrari, FIAT, Iso, Lancia, Lamborghini, Mercedes-Benz, Opel, and Volvo, among others. In addition, the Bertone studio was responsible for two of the later designs of the Lambretta motorscooter.

The company was based in Grugliasco in northern Italy. Gruppo Bertone was founded as Carrozzeria Bertone in 1912 by Giovanni Bertone. Designer Nuccio Bertone took charge of the company after World War II and the company was divided into two units: Carrozzeria for manufacturing and Stile Bertone for styling. Until its bankruptcy in 2014, the company was headed by the widow of Nuccio Bertone, Lilli Bertone. At the time of bankruptcy, it had some 100 direct employees. In 2014 most employees lost their jobs and were not absorbed by following acquisitions. Cars from the company museum went to other museums, like Automotoclub Storico Italiano and Volandia.

After its bankruptcy, the Bertone name was acquired by an architect and retained by some of its former employees, who continued as a Milan-based small external design office, Bertone Design, much more focused on industrial design and architecture.

Bertone Design was sold to the group AKKA Technologies in the second quarter of 2016, which already had automotive design activities through Mercedes Benz Technologies, owned by the group AKKA Technologies for several years. The AKKA Technologies group thus took the opportunity to increase its positioning in engineering and services to manufacturers to deliver turnkey vehicle projects.

The AKKA Technologies group subsequently sold the Bertone brand in 2020 to Mauro and Jean-Franck Ricci, the new owners.

In 2022 Mauro and Jean-Franck Ricci revived the Bertone brand, starting a new era as a coachbuilder of limited-edition ultra high-end sports cars. Mauro and Jean-Franck Ricci, with 38 years of experience in engineering and automotive and having established a successful engineering consultancy within mobility, merge the Bertone design heritage with high performance automotive engineering. The first in a series of limited edition vehicles, the GB110, was presented in December 2022, marking the 110th anniversary and the beginning of a new chapter in the Bertone history.

History
Giovanni Bertone started a carriage manufacturing business in Turin at the age of 28. Along with three workers, he built horse-drawn vehicles.

In the first decades of the 20th century, cars were not common; road traffic was dominated by horse-drawn carriages. The coaches built by the young Bertone were particularly regarded for their accuracy, quality, and solidity. In 1914, Bertone's second son, Giuseppe, nicknamed "Nuccio", was born. The outbreak of the First World War triggered a major crisis of the young Italian industrial sector and heavily affected Giovanni Bertone, who was forced to close his company.

1920s
At the end of the First World War, Bertone's business restarted and expanded its activities and began focusing on the automotive sector. In 1920, a new plant was opened near the Monginevro 119 in Turin.
Twenty people were on the payroll. One year later, the first important contract was signed to the company. This was a torpedo styled body based on the SPA 23S chassis. Then, the FIAT "501 Sport Siluro Corsa," the first of a family of models that would characterize the brand in the years to come, was designed.

During the 1920s, Turin was represented as one of the worldwide centers of excellence of the car industry. Bertone was at its hub and formed partnerships with almost all the manufacturers of the time. Giovanni Bertone began doing bodywork on the Fast, Chiribiri, Aurea, SCAT, and Diatto chassis. The most important and long-lasting relationships were those with the two biggest Turin manufacturers: FIAT and Lancia.

Vincenzo Lancia realized straight away that Giovanni Bertone was an outstanding skilled craftsman with a great future ahead of him. Affectionately nicknaming him "Bertunot", he commissioned Bertone to create complete car bodies, especially for the "limited series" that the companies of the day were not always equipped to manufacture. This was Bertone's first opportunity to carry out limited production of special cars on standard mechanical bases.

These were exciting years for Bertone himself and for the evolution of industrial style and design. The car body shapes were slowly but continuously changing, angular shapes began to fade, and wings started to be joined together.
Giovanni Bertone produced torpedo and saloon bodies for FIAT and Lancia, and for Itala, Diatto and SPA. He also worked on commissions for private customers eager for exclusivity. Alongside sports models like the 1928 Ansaldo 6BS, Giovanni Bertone also designed luxury cars like the Fiat 505 limousine and the Itala 51S, both in 1924. He later designed the Lancia Lambda VIII Series in 1928.

1930s
Despite the fact that the depression of 1929 had been devastating on many Turin carmakers, Giovanni Bertone's shrewd management allowed the company to carry on creating cars with an appeal. In 1932, Giovanni designed the Lancia Artena, which was produced until 1936. In 1933, the following year, a cornerstone event for the Carrozzeria Bertone occurred. Nuccio Bertone, who was nineteen at the time, officially began working in his father's company. During the same period, Bertone began working on commercial vehicles, and as the business grew, new premises were needed. The company moved to Corso Peschiera 225. Gruppo Bertone now had fifty members of staff.

In 1934, Bertone created the Fiat 527S Ardita 2500, a turning point in car design, with some new details such as the front headlights with fairing along the bonnet. With the Ardita, a new kind of style was created, which was destined to take off towards the end of the decade with FIAT and Lancia models. Examples were the 'six window' FIAT 1500 Aerodinamica, the opulent Lancia Aprilia Cabriolet, and the novel Fiat 1500 Torpedo, with structural features that had never been seen before, such as the fold-away hood which stowed away entirely inside the car.

1940s
With the outbreak of the Second World War, the car market experienced a sudden, drastic downturn. Almost all the bodywork manufacturers, including Bertone, reacted to the crisis by turning to military vehicles of various kinds. The company created vehicles such as the Bertone ambulance on a Lancia Artena base. This was a hard time for Bertone; demand was scarce, raw materials and labor were lacking, and military orders were difficult to fulfil. But production did not stop in the Corso Peschiera plant, as some luxurious Lancia Aprilia were manufactured as well as the extremely elegant long chassis Fiat 2800 cabriolet, the only one of its kind, built on commission for race driver and motoring journalist Giovanni Lurani Cernuschi.

After the war, as the long slow process of reconstruction began in Europe, the big industrial companies gradually scaled up their production levels, and the bodyworks got back to work. During these difficult years, Nuccio Bertone created cars like the Lancia Aprilia Cabriolet and the Fiat 1100 Stanguellini racing car, which were precursors to some of the design trends in the following decade.

At the end of the 1940s, Nuccio Bertone turned to racing at the wheel of a number of different cars, including a Fiat 500 Barchetta, which Nuccio built for himself. At the end of the decade, the meeting with Vittorio Stanguellini led to the creation of a coupé with a Fiat 1100 chassis which got a high public appreciation.

1950s
The 1950s brought in the first orders from countries other than Italy, in particular from MG and Bristol Cars Limited in 1952. The following year, Franco Scaglione designed the prototype for the Alfa Romeo Giulietta Sprint, which was presented at the 1954 Turin Motor Show. A production of 1,000 units was originally planned, but by the end, nearly 40,000 vehicles were made between 1954 and 1965. The car ceased production in 1965.

The relationship between Bertone and Alfa Romeo reached its creative peak with the Berlinetta Aerodinamica Tecnica (BAT) concept cars which pushed back the boundaries of car design and aerodynamics: the BAT 5 in 1953, the BAT 7 in 1954 and the BAT 9 of 1955. Research into aerodynamics culminated in the production of the Abarth 750 Record in 1956, built on a Fiat 600 chassis and tested on the high-speed track at Monza. This Abarth set an impressive ten world records, including doing  at an average of 156.36 km/h and covering 10,125.26 km in 72 hours.

In 1957, the company expanded to start the production of the NSU Sport Prinz. The factory in Corso Peschiera could not cope with the forecast production volumes. Construction work began in Grugliasco on the outskirts of Turin for a new plant that became operative in 1959, with a workforce of 550. At the end of the 1950s, Bertone came up with some sports Berlinettas which were to make history, such as the Giulietta Sprint Speciale, the Aston Martin DB2/4 and the Maserati 3500 GT.

1960s
The 1960s were the years of the Italian-style GT. Giorgetto Giugiaro came up with five variations on the theme which would always be dear to his heart. They were in the shape of five extremely racy GT models: the Alfa Romeo 2600 Sprint, in coupé and cabriolet versions, two Ferrari 250 GTs, one named 'Wax' after the commissioning client, and the others for his personal use, the Aston Martin DB4 GT 'Jet' and the Maserati 5000 GT. At the same time, two new industrial partnerships were getting underway, with the work on the Simca 1000 Coupé and the BMW 3200 CS limited series. The important, but unfortunate ASA 1000 GT, better known as the "Ferrarina", or "little Ferrari" (as the project originated with Enzo Ferrari), was a commercial failure upon its release despite the high expectations of the public.

The Iso Rivolta GT 300, the Iso Rivolta GT 340 and the Iso Grifo were also created in the 1960s. Giorgetto Giugiaro designed a prototype cabriolet of the latter and a racing version known as the A3C. The Grifo years were also the years of the Chevrolet Testudo, driven personally by Nuccio Bertone to the Geneva Motor Show in 1963. The following year saw the Alfa Romeo Canguro, followed in 1965 by the Alfa Romeo Giulia GT, the rightful heir of the Alfa Romeo Giulietta Sprint.

In 1965, Carrozzeria Bertone experienced a major turning-point, with the launch of the Fiat 850 Spider. The commercial success of this model led Nuccio Bertone to increase the company's production capacity to 120 units per day. Between 1965 and 1972 nearly 140,000 were produced, the great majority of which were sold in the United States. With the Fiat 850, the company took a giant leap forward in terms of production volumes, from the 13,000 units produced in 1966 to nearly 30,000 in 1968, an increase of 40 percent.

The end of the 1960s saw the beginning of the partnership with Ferruccio Lamborghini that was destined to make history in the car world. The first vehicle to come out of this was the Lamborghini Miura, which was presented at the 1966 Geneva Motor Show and reinvented the high-performance coupé design concept. The Miura was followed by the Marzal in 1967 and the Espada in 1968. In the same period, two other coupés appeared: the Alfa Romeo Montreal and the Fiat Dino Coupé, both out in 1967. Astounding, ground-breaking cars, they invented their own language for the design of the future: these were Marcello Gandini's trademarks. At the Paris Motor Show of 1968, Bertone presented the Carabo concept car, based on an Alfa 33 chassis.

1970s
The partnership with Lamborghini led to the development of the Lamborghini Espada, by 1973 known as the world's fastest four-seater. The design was inspired by an earlier concept, the Jaguar Pirana. After his initial success with the Espada, he went on to design the Lamborghini Jarama and the Lamborghini Urraco. With the Stratos Zero prototype, which was built on a Lancia Fulvia 1.6 HF base, Bertone came to represent a new point of reference in modern art, as well as on the international car design scene. The Stratos Zero, which was presented at the 1970 Turin Motor Show, evoked a timeless blend of architecture, sculpture, and industrial design.
The following year, with some of the Zero's styling cues as a starting point, Bertone created the Lancia Stratos Stradale, a compact coupé destined mainly for the racing circuit, and which went on to win numerous victories in world rally championships.

In 1972, Giovanni Bertone died.
In that year, as a tacit tribute to the company's founder, the Maserati Khamsin and the Fiat X1/9 were released. The latter, foreshadowed by the Autobianchi A112 Runabout concept car, was the heir of the 850 Spider and went on to enjoy the same runaway commercial success. Based on the Fiat 128 chassis but with a mid-rear-engine layout, the X1/9 was in production from 1972 to 1988, with 160,000 units manufactured.

Meanwhile, Marcello Gandini's prolific drawing board saw a succession of supercars, runabouts, and provocative style concepts. These included the 1973 Series 3 version of the Lamborghini Espada, which redesigned the dashboard configuration, the Lamborghini Countach and the Ferrari 308 GT4 of 1973, the Audi 50 and Innocenti Mini 90 of 1974, the Fiat 131 Abarth Rally in 1975, and the prototype Alfa Romeo Navajo in 1976.

In the same year, the company began working for Volvo on the 264 TE. The Volvo 262C, which was presented at the 1977 Geneva Motor Show, was entirely manufactured by Bertone, from the assembly of the basic body to the fitting of the mechanical components and the road trials.
This procedural turning point had a big role in transforming the company, which was now set to become a car manufacturer in its own right.

1980s
From the start of the 1980s, the Fiat Ritmo Cabrio and the Fiat X1/9 were produced and sold directly under the Bertone brand, meaning that the company was now responsible not only for production but also for the sales network and after-sales assistance for the two models.

In 1982, Marcello Gandini turned out another important design, the Citroën BX. After entering into a joint-venture with Volvo in 1985 the company began production of the Volvo 780, a two-door saloon entirely created by Bertone, from the formal design of the model to the full production cycle.

A new commercial agreement drawn up with General Motors Europe in 1986 saw the production of the Kadett Cabrio was handed over to Bertone. The new Pontiac Fiero GT body design was also due to this relationship with the stile Bertone department of the company.  The partnership with Opel continued with the first generation of the Opel Astra Cabrio, and with the Astra Coupé.
The end of the 1980s saw the Citroën XM, and the Freeclimber off-roader with mechanical components by Daihatsu and BMW engines.

1990s
Without abandoning its commitment to exploring the new languages of car design, Bertone entered the 1990s with its focus on technological innovations.
Capturing the attention of the public and experts alike at the 1992 Turin Motor Show was the aggressively futuristic Blitz Barchetta, a show car that featured an electric engine and avant-garde construction. The Barchetta had a tubular chassis in special steel integrated with sandwich-structured fiberglass panels, bodywork in composite materials, and carbon interiors.

In 1993 the Opel Astra Cabrio and the Fiat Punto Cabrio began production, with the entire production cycle for both cars at the Grugliasco factory; assembly of the bodywork, mechanical components integration, paintwork, and fittings. A complete production cycle, ending with the final testing process, was carried out according to the procedures and standards of the commissioning companies.

In 1994, continuing the company's research into low environmental impact vehicles, Bertone presented the Zero Emission Record (ZER), a futuristic reinterpretation of the Abarth 750 Record. Expressly conceived and created to yield the highest performance levels in the electric car sector, the ZER (which has a Cx of 0.11) set the world one-hour-long distance record (199.822 km), and broke the 300 km/h barrier, setting the new world speed record for electric cars (with a top speed of 303.977 km/h).

In 1994, Gruppo Bertone became the first manufacturer in Italy to be awarded the ISO 9001 quality certification. Meanwhile, Bertone did not turn its back on a past dedicated to bodywork and continued to design working prototypes; the Karisma in 1994, a four-seater Berlinetta on a Porsche base, the Kayak in 1995, a coupé on a Lancia K base, the Slalom 'coupé de chasse' on an Opel Astra Coupe/Cabrio base, and the Fiat Enduro 4x4, an SUV based on a Fiat Brava floorplan.

Bertone after Nuccio Bertone
On 26 February 1997, the evening of the Geneva Motor Show, Nuccio Bertone died, as "one of the greatest coachbuilders of the century, and international Maestro of Italian style," in the words of Fulvio Cinti, motoring journalist and car historian. His widow, Lilli Bertone, took over management of the company.

2000s
In the past, car manufacturers had paid more attention to the engineering of a car than to its design. By the 1990s they had realized the importance of design to their brand's success and were increasingly bringing more of the creative work in-house. This even applied to supercar manufacturers, who in the past had been a major client of the Italian design consultancies (carrozzeria). While Chinese and Indian manufacturers provided some work, this too decreased as once they gained confidence and they established their own in-house design studios. Despite these difficulties, Bertone obtained some specialist manufacturing projects and continued with design consulting.

However, by 2009, the worsening financial situation caused Bertone to sell its Grugliasco plant, along with its manufacturing activities to FIAT. Bertone underwent a major restructuring process and became a fully integrated service company in the automotive, transportation, and industrial design sectors. By then, the Bertone workforce had dropped to roughly 300 people, mainly engineers and designers, with a capacity of 300,000 engineering hours per year. This allowed it to manage up to four prototype projects per year, from first style drafts to effectively manufacturing prototypes.

2010s
The financial turmoil continued, leading Bertone to sell off some of its treasured collection of concept cars in 2011.

Bertone enters bankruptcy
After having ceased trading because of financial difficulties, Bertone on 18 March 2014 confirmed that it would be declared bankrupt if a suitable buyer was not found by the end of April.

Creation of Bertone Design
In May 2013, the license rights to the brand were granted by Bertone Cento to Bertone Design, a company established in Milan, led by architect Aldo Cingolani with the aim of reviving the brand in various fields, such as architecture, industrial design, and fashion. Bertone Design also operates in the railway sector. A more recent unique project was a partnership with Citroën, but since the 2013 acquisition of the name, a car prototype or series was never made.

Bertone brand 
In June 2016, the Bertone brand was acquired for more than 2.6 million euros by AKKA Technologies, an engineering company active in the automotive, railway, and aerospace sectors. The rights to use the brand, however, were shared with the Bertone Design which not had the authorization to use it in the automotive field.

Starting from November 2018, AKKA Technologies sold the license to use the Bertone brand in the electric automotive sector to Flymove Holding Limited UK, which in May 2019 proceeded with the definitive purchase of the brand for all applications and sectors. They relaunched Bertone through the presentation of new models of fully electric cars designed by Carlos Arroyo Turon (former Bertone Designer) and which use the innovative battery swap system (Battery Swap System).

2020s - The Renaissance 
The AKKA Technologies group subsequently sold the Bertone brand to Ideactive, a company owned by Mauro and Jean-Franck Ricci. In 2022 the two Ricci brothers, who are passionate about cars,  revived the Bertone brand, starting a new era as a coachbuilder of limited-edition ultra high-end sports cars. The first in a series of limited edition vehicles, the GB110, was launched in December 2022, marking the 110th anniversary and the beginning of a new chapter in the Bertone history.

Design and production activity

Passenger car designs

Motorcycle designs

 Lambretta Luna Range: Lui/Vega/Cometa (1968)
 Lambretta GP/DL (1969)

Vehicles produced by Bertone, but not of Bertone design
 BMW C1 (2000–2003)
 Fiat Punto Cabrio (1995–1999)
 Mini Cooper GP (2006)
 Volvo 262C (1977–1981)

Notable designers
 Mario Revelli di Beaumont
 Nuccio Bertone
 Franco Scaglione
 Giovanni Michelotti
 Giorgetto Giugiaro
 Marcello Gandini
 Marc Deschamps
 Michael Vernon Robinson
 Jason Castriota
 Giuliano Biasio

Notes

References
AutoCar (UK) November 26, 2007 Bertone's on the brink
Automotive World November 27, 2007 Carrozzeria Bertone files for bankruptcy protection 
AutoWeek January 2, 2008 'New white knight emerges for Bertone'

External links
Carrozzeria Bertone - the official web site
Bertone Design - the official web site
Coachbuild.com Encyclopedia: Bertone 
Posters for 100 years anniversary of Bertone

 
Engineering companies of Italy
Coachbuilders of Italy
Italian automobile designers
Convertible top suppliers
Vehicle manufacturing companies established in 1912
Turin motor companies
Italian companies established in 1912
Motorcycle manufacturers of Italy
Design companies established in 1912
Design companies disestablished in 1914
Design companies of Italy
Car manufacturers of Italy